Slimeball 3 is the fourth mixtape by American rapper Young Nudy. It was released on August 8, 2018, by RCA Records. It is a follow-up to 2017's Slimeball 2 and Nudy Land and serves as the third mixtape in the Slimeball series. The mixtape features guest appearances from American rappers 6lack and Future. The production was handled by several high-profile record producers, including Maaly Raw, Cardiak, Cubeatz, Illmind, Metro Boomin, Pi'erre Bourne, and Wheezy, among others. The album debuted at number 146 on the Billboard 200 albums chart in the United States. The mixtape was supported by one single, "Zone 6 (Remix)" featuring American rapper Future and American singer 6lack.

Track listing
Credits adapted from Tidal.

Personnel
Cory Mo – mixing
Joe LaPorta – mastering

Charts

References

Sequel albums
Young Nudy albums
2018 mixtape albums
RCA Records albums
Albums produced by Cubeatz
Albums produced by Illmind
Albums produced by Metro Boomin
Albums produced by Pi'erre Bourne